Graham Jones (born 25 October 1960) is  a former Australian rules footballer who played with Sydney in the Victorian Football League (VFL).

Notes

External links 
		

Living people
1960 births
Australian rules footballers from New South Wales
Sydney Swans players
Western Suburbs Magpies AFC players